The Napo spiny rat (Proechimys quadruplicatus) is a spiny rat species found in Brazil, Colombia, Ecuador, Peru and Venezuela.

Phylogeny
Morphological characters and mitochondrial cytochrome b DNA sequences showed that P. quadruplicatus belongs to the so-called goeldii group of Proechimys species, and shares closer phylogenetic affinities with the other members of this clade: P. steerei and P. goeldii.

References

Proechimys
Mammals of Colombia
Fauna of the Amazon
Mammals described in 1948
Taxa named by Philip Hershkovitz